The MACH Alliance is a not-for-profit advocacy group whose members include software vendors, systems integrators, agencies, and individual experts, called "Ambassadors", advocating for open and best-of-breed enterprise technology ecosystems. The Alliance was formed in June 2020 and has, as of February 2023, 78 members spanning three continents. Notable members are, in alphabetical order, Amazon Web Services, Capgemini, Deloitte, Google Cloud Platform, MongoDB, Publicis Sapient, Wunderman Thompson.

History
The MACH alliance was founded in June 2020 by four companies: Contentstack, Commercetools, EPAM Systems, and Valtech plus ten inaugural members: Algolia, Amplience, Cloudinary, Constructor.io, Contentful, E2X, Fluent commerce, Frontastic, Mobify and Vue Storefront. MACH is an acronym for microservices-based, application programme interface-first, cloud-native software-as-a-service and headless offerings.
About a year later, MACH membership reached 30 members and again a year later doubling to about 60 members.

Membership
The MACH Alliance actively seeks software vendors, systems integrators, agencies, consultancies, and individual experts who share their vision for open and best-of-breed enterprise technology ecosystems. For like-minded organizations the MACH Alliance established certification standards that help identify those that embrace MACH philosophies and offer MACH-certified services. In order to become a member, an organization must be in full compliance. Sticking to a concise definition of what services qualify and zealously enforcing this throughout their member application process has earned the MACH Alliance a reputation of being "bouncers controlling the velvet rope at the entrance of the Coolest Tech in Town Club".

Activities
The MACH alliance's main activities in support of their advocacy of open and best-of-breed enterprise technology ecosystem are: events and the publication of various content pieces.

Benefits of MACH
The advantages of an open and best-of-breed enterprise technology ecosystem that the MACH Alliance advocates are:
 Flexibility: users can choose the cloud services they want based on their unique requirements and context allowing for easy customization and speedy changes.
 Resourcefulness: the flexibility to choose only required cloud services implies a reduction in overhead, a leaner footprint compared to more holistic, all-in-one platforms, thereby reducing costs.
 Best-of-breed: Best-of-breed, implying a collection of expert applications doing one thing really well, can improve quality and agility.
 Developer focus: MACH supports being developer-first, which can be an asset for companies prioritizing developer experience.
 Speed: MACH-based cloud services provide firms with faster rollouts that can be scaled faster.

Drawbacks of MACH
The open and best-of-breed enterprise technology ecosystem that the MACH Alliance advocates has drawbacks:
 Increased maintenance: managing many cloud services from different vendors brings maintenance hurdles associated with tracking, monitoring and securing the various integration points.
 Stitching: managing many cloud services from different vendors brings orchestration challenges when stitching them together to make service components talk to each other.
 Set-up costs: initial costs and engineering time can be higher compared to implementing all-in-one platform due to the coordination requirements between cloud services.
 Assistance: companies unfamiliar with MACH may need help from systems integrators or middleware to orchestrate connections between cloud services.
 Lack of standards: at present MACH is a general architecture rather than a standard specification, which implies that technologies and the behaviors may differ from cloud service to cloud service.

Members

As of February 2023, its members are:

References

External links

 
Organizations established in 2020
Information technology lobbying organizations